The Saratovskaya garmonika, named after the Russian city of Saratov, is a colorful variant on the standard one row push–pull diatonic button accordion. The chief distinguishing characteristic of this little folk accordion is that it plays the tonic scale (and major chord) on the bellows draw and the dominant on the bellows press, the reverse of a standard diatonic box. Another curious feature is the addition of two bells on the top of the instrument which are struck with tiny metal hammers attached to the bass and chord buttons for rhythmic accompaniment. They add a fun accent on dance tunes. It is possible to play the basses very lightly and avoid activating the bells, as they become rather tiresome after a while. The basses also have an additional tonic chord button in the center, lighter in tone than the regular chord, which is not attached to the hammers.

See also 
 Саратовская гармоника 

Accordion
Russian musical instruments